Maria Isabelle Climaco-Salazar (born September 7, 1966), also known as Beng Climaco, is a Filipina politician, and former mayor of Zamboanga City in Mindanao, Philippines. Prior to this she was councilor of the city's 1st district for two terms, and its vice mayor. She is the second woman to become a mayor of Zamboanga City. She unsuccessfully sought for a seat representing the 1st District of Zamboanga City in the 2022 Philippine general election.

Early life and family
Beng Climaco is the daughter of former Vice Mayor Jose Climaco and the niece of Mayor Cesar Climaco.

Education
She is a graduate of Parsippany Hills High School in Parsippany–Troy Hills, New Jersey, in the United States. She earned her Bachelor of Science in Education degree from Ateneo de Zamboanga University and her Masters in family counseling from Ateneo de Manila University. She was a guidance counselor and taught English and Religion at the Ateneo de Zamboanga University.

She was awarded with international scholarships, namely the International Visitor Leadership Program, the American Council for Young Political Leaders and the Hubert Humphrey Scholarship Program. Likewise, Rotary International also recognized her significant contribution to civil society by choosing her to be part of the Rotary Group Study Exchange in Brazil. She was awarded with a Rotary International Presidential Citation by the Rotary Club of Metro Zamboanga in her incumbency as club president.

She became Head of the Delegation of the Philippine Council of Young Political Leaders to the International Exchange Program of the Australian Political Exchange Council in Melbourne, Canberra and Sydney, Australia, and also became the co-head of the Philippine delegation and a resource person to the 8th International Conference of AIDS in Asia and the Pacific (ICAAP) held in Colombo, Sri Lanka.

Early career
In 1992, she became a reporter and then newscaster for Zamboanga City's Golden Broadcast Professionals. She became one of the co-anchors of the then-English version of Dateline Zamboanga until 1998 when she left to run for councilor, a race she won.

Political career

City Council stint, 1998-2004
As a councilor of Zamboanga City for two terms, she filed 858 council resolutions that advocated for women, family, youth, children, education, work and social welfare. One of her pieces of legislation, the creation of the Multi-Sectoral Anti-AIDS Council, presently brings various awards to the city. One is the Trailblazer Award of the country's prestigious Gawad Galing Pook. Another legislative measure is the Child Internet Protection Ordinance which protects minors from the influences of pornography on the Internet and as well as the introduction of the Gender and Development Program and the Implementation of R.A. 7192 in Zamboanga City.

Vice-mayor, 2004-2007
In 2004 she won by a landslide, garnering the most votes, more than any other candidate in the history of the City of Zamboanga, making her the youngest and first elected woman vice mayor of the city. On her watch, the city council of Zamboanga was named the Second Most Outstanding Council in the country.

City Representative, 2007-2013 
First term, 2007-2010
Because of her achievements as vice mayor in city council, the residents of Zamboanga City voted her representative of the 1st District to the 14th Philippine Congress in May 2007, where she became the first congresswoman to occupy the post. Despite being a neophyte member of the 14th Congress, she is vice chairman of the Committees on Women, Local Government, the Special Committees on East Asian Growth Area, and the Special Committee on Education and Welfare of Special Persons.

She was one of the authors of the House Bill seeking the Magna Carta for Women in this Congress which was passed as a law August 2009. Likewise, she also spearheaded the Lady Legislators of the 14th Congress, in launching Pink October, the first-ever breast cancer awareness and prevention campaign in the House of Representatives.

Second term, 2010-2013
In her second term, Representative Maria Isabelle Climaco-Salazar was elected as House Deputy Speaker for Mindanao.

City Mayor, 2013-2022

In 2013, Climaco was elected as Mayor of Zamboanga City. However barely three months in office, Salazar was beset by lawless MNLF elements attacking the city proper in September 2013 crippling the city's economic and social life.

Climaco also promotes the Chavacano language as part of Zamboanga's culture. The Dia de Fundacio Chavacano, an annual June 23 celebration aims to promote the language through the launch of new Chavacano books such as dictionaries and grammar books and quiz bees for local schools.

Personal life
On February 28, 2009, Beng wed Retired General Trifonio Salazar. Her wedding coincided with the birthday of her late uncle Mayor Cesar C. Climaco to honor the influence has had in her life.

References

External links
 

1966 births
Living people
People from Zamboanga City
Mayors of Zamboanga City
Members of the House of Representatives of the Philippines from Zamboanga City
Women members of the House of Representatives of the Philippines
Filipino city and municipal councilors
Liberal Party (Philippines) politicians
Deputy Speakers of the House of Representatives of the Philippines
Ateneo de Manila University alumni
Women mayors of places in the Philippines
Parsippany Hills High School alumni
People from Parsippany-Troy Hills, New Jersey